Armley is an unincorporated community in Connaught Rural Municipality No. 457, Saskatchewan, Canada. Approximately halfway between Tisdale and Nipawin, northwest of the intersection of Highway 35 and Highway 335. Armley was the site of the Humboldt Broncos bus crash, killing 16 hockey players and personnel from a team in the city of Humboldt.

History 
Coming into existence in the early 1900s as the farming region was settled, Armley reached its peak during the 1920s with the arrival of the Canadian Pacific Railway in 1924.

With the decline in the rural population of Saskatchewan and the consolidation of businesses and services in larger centres, the townsite now only contains a local community hall and a handful of houses. The former general store, church, post office, hotel and grain elevators are no longer in operation.

See also 
 List of communities in Saskatchewan

References 

Homestead to Heritage 
Armley History Book Committee
Friesen Printers, 1987

External links 
Saskatchewan City & Town Maps
Saskatchewan Gen Web - One Room School Project 
Post Offices and Postmasters - ArchiviaNet - Library and Archives Canada
Saskatchewan Gen Web Region
Online Historical Map Digitization Project
GeoNames Query 
2001 Community Profiles

Connaught No. 457, Saskatchewan
Ghost towns in Saskatchewan
Unincorporated communities in Saskatchewan